Vanzaghello is a comune (municipality) in the Province of Milan in the Italian region Lombardy, located about  northwest of Milan.

Vanzaghello borders the following municipalities: Samarate, Lonate Pozzolo, Magnago, Castano Primo. The economy, traditionally connected to textile industries and craftsmen, is now increasingly based on services.

References

External links
 Official website

Cities and towns in Lombardy